This is a list of the Australia men's national soccer team results from 1922 to 1949

1920s

1922

1923

1924

1930s

1933

1936

1938

1940s

1947

1948

References

External links
 Socceroo International Games
 PDF of Australia's caps and captains listing full international matches

Australia national soccer team results
1922 in Australian sport
1923 in Australian sport
1924 in Australian sport
1933 in Australian sport
1936 in Australian sport
1938 in Australian sport
1947 in Australian sport
1948 in Australian sport